Berghof or Berghoff may refer to:

 Berghof (residence), Adolf Hitler's home in the mountains of Bavaria
 Berghof (Sölden), a residence and former farmstead in Austria
 Berghof (Vienna), a Roman settlement in Vienna, Austria
 The Berghoff (restaurant), Chicago, US
 Berghoff, a beer brewed by the Joseph Huber Brewing Company
 German exonym for the city of Brocēni, Latvia
 The fictional sanatorium in Thomas Mann's novel The Magic Mountain

People
Herman Berghoff, founder of The Berghoff (restaurant) in Chicago, US
Henry C. Berghoff, German-American businessman and politician, co-founder of the Herman J. Berghoff Brewing Company, 19th Mayor of Fort Wayne, brother of Herman Berghoff
Maggie Berghoff, American clinician

See also
 Berkhoff (surname)
 Berkhof (disambiguation)
 Berkoff (disambiguation)